Earnest Alexander Byner (born September 15, 1962) is an American former professional football player who was a running back in the National Football League (NFL). He is now the running back coach of Out-of-Door Academy.

Playing career

East Carolina University (1980–83) 
Byner was a fullback at East Carolina University from 1980 to 1983 where he gained 2,049 yards on 378 carries. Byner was inducted into the East Carolina Hall of Fame in 1998.  He is a member of Kappa Alpha Psi fraternity.

National Football League (1984–1997) 
Byner was drafted by the Cleveland Browns in the tenth round (280th pick overall) of the 1984 NFL Draft.  He played for the Browns (1984–1988; 1994–1995), Washington Redskins (1989–1993) and the Baltimore Ravens (1996–1997).  He finished his 14-year NFL career ranked 16th on the NFL's all-time rushing list with 8,261 yards on 2,095 carries, with 56 touchdowns.  He also caught 512 passes for 4,605 yards and 15 touchdowns, returned 33 kickoffs for 576 yards, and scored a touchdown on a recovered fumble, totaling 13,442 all-purpose yards and 72 career scores.  In addition to his #16 rushing yards ranking at the time of his retirement, Byner finished his career within the NFL's top 50 all-time leaders in rushing attempts, rushing touchdowns, and total yards. Byner's 512 receptions is tied for 13th most by halfback/fullback/running back in NFL history as of 2018.

A productive, reliable running back who could rush, block and catch the ball out of the backfield, Byner was a popular player in Cleveland. Paired with power runner Kevin Mack in the Brown backfield, the pair both gained over 1,000 yards in the 1985 season. Byner helped the Browns reach the AFC Championship game in both 1986 and 1987 seasons, meeting the Denver Broncos in both games.

In the 1987 AFC Championship game he was instrumental in a Browns comeback from a 21–3 deficit to place the Browns in position to win the game. With the score tied at 31 midway through the 4th quarter, the Broncos scored a go-ahead touchdown to make the score 38–31 with six minutes to play. In the ensuing Cleveland drive the Browns worked the ball down the field to reach the Denver 8 yard line with a little over a minute left in the game. On the next play Byner took the Kosar handoff to run off left tackle. Byner powered past the Bronco line and looked sure to score a game-tying touchdown when Bronco defensive back Jeremiah Castille managed to strip him of the ball. The play, now known simply as The Fumble, became the play for which Byner is best remembered. The fumble marred an otherwise impressive performance, as he finished the game with 67 rushing yards, seven receptions for 120 yards, and two touchdowns.

Byner played another season with Cleveland before being traded to the Washington Redskins for running back Mike Oliphant before the start of the 1989 season. In Super Bowl XXVI, in 1992, he caught a touchdown pass in the second quarter, and the Redskins won, giving him the NFL Championship he could not win with the Browns.

Byner was a Pro Bowl selection in 1990 when he ranked fourth in the NFL with 1,219 yards rushing and in 1991 when he ranked fifth in the NFL with 1,048 yards rushing.  His time with the Redskins earned him a position as one of the franchise's 70 Greatest Redskins.

Coaching

Baltimore Ravens 

He worked in the Baltimore Ravens front office as the Director of Player Development after retiring as a player.  He was the first player to be inducted into the Ravens' Ring of Honor in 2000.

Washington Redskins 
In January 2004, Byner was hired to be the Running Backs Coach on Joe Gibbs' staff. He held the same position with the Redskins organization for four seasons.

Tennessee Titans 
On March 10, 2008, Byner was officially announced as the Running Back Coach for the Tennessee Titans. He was replaced by the Tennessee Titans on January 25, 2010 by former Running Back coach for the Jacksonville Jaguars, Kennedy Pola.

Jacksonville Jaguars 
He was named the Jacksonville Jaguars running backs coach on February 4, 2010.

Tampa Bay Buccaneers 

He was named Buccaneers running backs coach on February 19, 2012, but was let go after the 2013 season when the head coach and GM were fired.

References

External links
 Official website
 Tennessee Titans bio
 

1962 births
Living people
American football fullbacks
Baltimore Ravens coaches
Baltimore Ravens players
Cleveland Browns players
East Carolina Pirates football players
Jacksonville Jaguars coaches
Tampa Bay Buccaneers coaches
Tennessee Titans coaches
Washington Redskins coaches
Washington Redskins players
National Conference Pro Bowl players
People from Milledgeville, Georgia
Players of American football from Georgia (U.S. state)
Ed Block Courage Award recipients